is a Japanese actress known for her appearances in the pink film genre. She has appeared in award-winning pink films, and was herself given a "Best Actress" award for her work in 1997.

Career 
Megumi Makihara has appeared in pink films and V-cinema for several notable directors. Her performance in Takahisa Zeze's Scent of a Female: Rapturous Pistil (1996), won Makihara the Best New Actress, 4th place at the Pink Grand Prix, and the film was selected as third best pink film release of the year. The director with whom Makihara worked most was Tarō Araki, who is considered one of OP Eiga's top directors.

Makihara appeared in director Mitsuru Meike's debut, Lascivious Nurse Uniform Diary: Two or Three Times, While I'm Wet (1997), which won Meike the Best New Director title at the Pink Grand Prix, and was named the seventh best pink release of the year. Makihara was awarded the Best Actress of the year at the same ceremony for her performance in Yutaka Ikejima's Big Tits * Beautiful Tits * Obscene Tits: Rubbing Competition. She appeared onscreen with Ikejima in the gay-themed ENK studio's New Gay Bar Love Story. She worked with Meike again in his V-cinema release, Confession of a New Nurse (1998).

Along with AV idol Yumika Hayashi, Makihara appeared in the third episode of the drama series . Titled , the episode aired on TV Asahi on July 26, 1997.

Partial filmography

Bibliography

English

Japanese

References

 
|-
! colspan="3" style="background: #DAA520;" | Pink Grand Prix
|-

Japanese film actresses
Pink film actors
Living people
Year of birth missing (living people)